Clinton is a station on the Chicago Transit Authority's 'L' system, serving the Green Line and Pink Line. It opened on October 16, 1909, and was completely rebuilt during the Green Line rehabilitation project in 1996.

History and location

Canal
Opening in 1893 as part of the newly opened Lake Street Elevated, the Canal station was located above Canal Street west of the Chicago River and railroads leading up to Union Station. The station eventually closed in 1909, which was replaced by the newly opened Clinton station a block west.

Clinton
It is the closest 'L' station to the Ogilvie Transportation Center, whose platforms directly abut Clinton. The stations were connected in 1970 with a passageway, called the "Northwest Passage", linking it to the Chicago and North Western Terminal.  The passageway closed in 1990 when the C&NW Terminal was rebuilt as Ogilvie Transportation Center, replaced by a holding track for Metra trains.

Bus connections
CTA
  J14 Jeffery Jump 
  56 Milwaukee 
  125 Water Tower Express

Notes and references

Notes

References

External links

Clinton Street entrance from Google Maps Street View

CTA Green Line stations
CTA Pink Line stations
Railway stations in the United States opened in 1909